Dietmar Thöni (born 19 January 1968) is an Austrian former alpine skier.

See also
Alpine skiing in Austria
Glossary of skiing and snowboarding terms
History of skiing

References

External links
 THOENI Dietmar - Athlete Information

1968 births
Living people
Austrian male alpine skiers
Place of birth missing (living people)